Oakleigh Cannons Football Club is a soccer club based in the south-east Melbourne suburb of Oakleigh, Victoria, Australia. The club, established by members of Oakleigh's Greek Australian community, currently competes in the NPL Victoria. The club's home ground is at Jack Edwards Reserve, on Edward Street, Oakleigh.

History
South Oakleigh Soccer Club was established on 12 December 1972. The club soon changed its name to Oakleigh Soccer Club.

In the 1970s and 1980s, the club steadily gained success by winning a number of Victorian Provisional, Metropolitan and State League divisional titles.

The club won championships in both of its first two years of competition, taking out the Victorian District League East in 1973 and 1974. Oakleigh won its next title in 1978, when it took out the Victorian District League Division 1, winning promotion to the Victorian Provisional League Division 2, which it won in its first year in 1979, achieving promotion to Provisional League Division 1.

The club achieved three successive promotions in 1981, 1982 and 1983, taking the club from the Victorian Provisional League Division 1 to Victorian Metropolitan League Division 4, 3 and subsequently 2. The club won back-to-back titles in 1985 and 1986, the latter title granting them Victorian State League (later rebranded to the Victorian Premier League and then National Premier Leagues Victoria) status for the first time. The club finished 12th in their first season in Victoria's top flight of football.

The club was re-branded Oakleigh Cannons S.C. in the 1990s to expand its appeal beyond its predominantly Greek Australian support base. The club changed its name again to Oakleigh Cannons Football Club and gained promotion to the Victorian Premier League in 2003. The club finished runners up in their first season back in the top flight in 2004, but lost to both Bulleen Zebras and Altona Magic in the finals series. In the 2005 season, the club finished in 5th place to again qualify for the finals series, beating Fawkner-Whittlesea in the elimination final but then losing to Heidelberg United FC in the semi final.

The club won its first VPL Premiership in 2006, finishing 12 points clear at the top of the table. Disappointingly, the club lost to Altona Magic in the qualifying final and Heidelberg United in the semi final. The club again made the finals series in 2007, but lost to Melbourne Knights FC in the semi final, making it four successive years of finals disappointment for the South East club.

Led by Arthur Papas, Oakleigh just missed out on the 2011 championship title, won by Green Gully SC on goal difference after both sides finished the season with 43 points. Oakleigh made the grand final that year, facing up against minor premiers Green Gully, but lost 3–2 after extra time, with Hamid Basma scoring the winner in the 95th minute. Oakleigh again made the grand final in 2012, playing against Dandenong Thunder SC at AAMI Park in Melbourne. They lost 2–1 after Nate Foster scored an 81st-minute winner for Thunder.

Five games into the 2013 season, Oakleigh sacked manager Bill Theodoropoulos and brought in former Gold Coast United FC manager Miron Bleiberg.

National Premier Leagues Victoria

In early 2014, it was announced that Oakleigh would be a part of the newly formed NPL Victoria, which was to replace the old Victorian Premier League. Oakleigh Cannons finished runners-up in their first season in the new competition, seven points behind South Melbourne FC.

In March 2015, high-profile manager Miron Bleiberg departed the club and Oakleigh returned Arthur Papas from his stint in India. Oakleigh began to rise up off the bottom of the ladder and qualified for the 2015 FFA Cup. Oakleigh also managed to make the final of the Dockerty Cup, but lost to South Melbourne at Lakeside Stadium. The Club finished in 11th place in the league, unable to overcome their poor form from early on in the season, despite big name signings including Mirjan Pavlovic, Matthew Foschini, Sean Rooney and Kofi Danning. Their FFA Cup form was much better, though. Oakleigh draw Queensland NPL side Far North Queensland in the Round of 32 and progressed after winning a penalty shoot-out. In the Round of 16, Oakleigh draw North Eastern MetroStars away from home, and won 1–0 thanks to a Pavlovic strike in South Australia. Oakleigh then drew fellow NPL Victoria side Hume City in the quarter finals, but went down 3–2 after extra time at ABD Stadium in front of 1,500 fans.

Late in September 2015, coach Arthur Papas resigned. Peter Tsolakis and Con Tangalakis were appointed as joint head coaches for the 2016 season.

In 2017, Oakleigh finished sixth in the league, beating Avondale FC on penalties in the elimination final before losing to Heidelberg United in the semi final. Dusan Bosnjak scored 17 goals, the second highest total in the league, second only to Heidelberg's Kenny Athiu. In 2018, the Cannons finished in fifth place in the league. Oakleigh beat Pascoe Vale in the elimination final but then went out to eventual champions Heidelberg on penalties in the semi final.

In 2019, Oakleigh managed just 5 points in its first 10 games, seeing the club languish in bottom place. However, the Cannons went the next 16 games undefeated with 12 wins and 4 draws to finish the home-and-away season in 3rd place. In the finals series, Oakleigh beat Hume City 2–0 before going down 2–0 to Avondale. New signing Joe Guest won the NPL Victoria Gold Medal.

In 2021 the State Government announced a $4 million upgrade to Jack Edwards Reserve.

Honours
National Premier Leagues Victoria/Victorian Premier League 

Championship: 2022

Premiership:  2006, 2021

Runners Up: 2011, 2012

Victorian State League Division 1 
Championship: 1986, 1999, 2003

9 x Victorian State League Premierships

Individual honours
NPL Victoria Gold Medal
2019 – Joe Guest

VPL Coach of the Year
2011 – Arthur Papas

VPL Goalkeeper of the Year
2004 – Adrian Cagalj

Weinstein Medal
1983 – Con Kiakos

Current squad

Staff 
Head coach:
 Chris Taylor

Assistant coaches:
 Chris Marshall
 Steve Pantelidis

Goalkeeper coach:
 Bojo Jevdjevic

Strength and conditioning coach:
 Stefan Rudzki

Head physio:
 John Gerakinis

Team manager:
 Eric Martin

General manager:
 Aki Ionnas

Reserve Squad

Notes

External links
Official website

 
Association football clubs established in 1972
National Premier Leagues clubs
Soccer clubs in Melbourne
Victorian Premier League teams
Greek-Australian culture in Melbourne
1972 establishments in Australia
Sport in the City of Monash